Webster No. 5 Precinct is located in Pope County, Illinois, USA.  As of the 2000 census, its population was 805.

Geography

References

Precincts in Pope County, Illinois